Cymindis psammodes is a species of ground beetle in the subfamily Harpalinae. It was described by Andrewes in 1932.

References

psammodes
Beetles described in 1932